The M-class trams were built by the Randwick Tramway Workshops for use on tourist services on the Sydney tram network to replace two modified G class trams. Originally allocated to Fort Macquarie Tram Depot, they later moved to Newtown and again to Ultimo before being scrapped in 1941.

References

Further reading

External links

Trams in Sydney
Tram vehicles of Australia